Mureropodia is an animal that existed in what is now the Valdemiedes Formation of Spain during the early Cambrian period. It was described by José Antonio Gámez Vintaned, Eladio Liñán and Andrey Yu. Zhuravlev in 2011, and the type and only species is M. apae.

The only specimen or holotype of M. apae (MPZ 2009/1241) was named and interpreted as an anterior section of a xenusiid lobopodian by Gámez et al. (2011). However, it was reinterpreted as a partial isolated frontal appendage of a member of the radiodont genus Caryosyntrips (labeled as Caryosyntrips cf. camurus) by Pates & Daley (2017). While the reinterpretation was criticized by Gámez Vintaned & Zhuravlev (2018), Pates et al. (2018) provided additional evidences that could reject the lobopodian affinities (and support for the radiodont affinities) of MPZ 2009/1241, such as the uncomparable proportion of "head/proboscis" (frontal appendage termination) and "lobopod" (endites or ventral spines) to other lobopodians, and the "antenna" and "claws" were also revealed to be artifacts instead of part of the specimen.

As of the late 2010s, most literatures did not agree on the lobopodian affinities of MPZ 2009/1241. For example, Lerosey-Aubril & Pates (2018) follow the interpretation of MPZ 2009/1241 as a radiodont, estimated it as a Caryosyntrips measured about 36.7 cm to 54 cm in life.

References

Fossil taxa described in 2011